Pine Level refers to three places in the U.S. state of Florida:

Pine Level, DeSoto County, Florida
Pine Level, Hillsborough County, Florida
Pine Level, Santa Rosa County, Florida, a census-designated place